Soul is a 2013 Taiwanese horror film written and directed by Chung Mong-hong. The film was selected as the Taiwanese entry for the Best Foreign Language Film at the 86th Academy Awards, but it was not nominated. The film was screened in the Vanguard section of the 2013 Toronto International Film Festival.

Plot
A young man is possessed by the soul of a psychopath, and is helped by his father to exorcise it.

Cast
 Joseph Chang as A-chuan
 Jimmy Wang as Wang
 Chen Shiang-chyi as Yun
 Leon Dai as Son-in-law 
 Jag Huang as A-chuan's Workmate
 Chen Yu-hsun as Doctor Wu
 Chin Shih-chieh as Messenger
 Wu Pong-fong
 Tou Chung-hua

See also
 List of submissions to the 86th Academy Awards for Best Foreign Language Film
 List of Taiwanese submissions for the Academy Award for Best Foreign Language Film

References

External links
 

2013 films
2013 horror films
Taiwanese horror films
Films directed by Chung Mong-hong
Taiwanese supernatural horror films
2010s Mandarin-language films